Grigoryevka is a rural locality (a village) in Karmyshevsky Selsoviet, Alsheyevsky District, Bashkortostan, Russia. The population was 22 as of 2010. There is one street.

Geography 
Grigoryevka is located 13 km southwest of Rayevsky (the district's administrative centre) by road. Mikhaylovka is the nearest rural locality.

References 

Rural localities in Alsheyevsky District